Beat Factory was a Canadian urban music management and production company, and later, an independent record label, based in Toronto, Ontario.

In 1982, Beat Factory was founded by Ivan Berry and songwriter Rupert Gayle. Throughout the 1980s and '90s, Beat Factory managed the top urban music artists in Canada. In 1988, Berry signed Michie Mee to an international record deal with Atlantic Records, making her the first Canadian hip hop artist signed to a major label. Beat Factory's biggest success was the Dream Warriors, who sold 800,000 copies of their debut album And Now the Legacy Begins, released in 1991.

In 1996, Berry founded Beat Factory Music Inc., a record label division of Beat Factory, distributed by EMI Music Canada and BMG Music Canada. The label released a series of compilation albums, known as RapEssentials and GroovEssentials. These albums included the first singles by Kardinal Offishall and Glenn Lewis, both of whom became prominent artists in the 2000s.

See also

List of record labels

References

Companies established in 1982
Record labels established in 1996
Canadian independent record labels
Canadian hip hop record labels
Contemporary R&B record labels
Defunct record labels of Canada
1982 establishments in Ontario